Diogo Carvalho (born 26 March 1988 in Coimbra) is a Portuguese swimmer. He made his Olympic debut at the 2008 Summer Olympics in the 200 metre individual medley. He competed in the 200 and 400 m individual medleys at the 2012 Summer Olympics.  He competed in the 200 m individual medley at the 2016 Summer Olympics.

He currently holds 9 individual national records, 6 short course (200 m freestyle, 50, 100 and 200 metres butterfly and 200 and 400 metres medleys) and 2 long course (100 fly and the 200 m medley). His swimming club is Clube dos Galitos de Aveiro in Aveiro. He studies medicine at the University of Coimbra.

Personal bests
Short course

Long course

Results

200m Individual Medley

References

External links 
 
 

1988 births
Living people
Portuguese male swimmers
Olympic swimmers of Portugal
Swimmers at the 2008 Summer Olympics
Swimmers at the 2012 Summer Olympics
Swimmers at the 2016 Summer Olympics
Sportspeople from Coimbra
20th-century Portuguese people
21st-century Portuguese people